Baluchi may refer to:

Common meanings 
 Balochi language, a language of Iran, Pakistan and Afghanistan
 an adjective for something related to the Baloch people or to Balochistan

Places

Afghanistan
Baluchi, Balkh, Afghanistan
Balūchī, Helmand, Afghanistan
Balūchī, Herat, Afghanistan
Balūchī, Orūzgān, Afghanistan
Balūchī, Sar-e Pol, Afghanistan

Iran 
 Baluchi, Fars
 Baluchi, Chabahar, Sistan and Baluchestan Province
 Baluchi-ye Bala, Sistan and Baluchestan Province
 Baluchi-ye Pain, Sistan and Baluchestan Province

See also
Baluch (disambiguation)
Al Balushi, a surname
Bellucci, an Italian surname